Einar Emil Andreas Olsson (18 July 1886 – 1983) was a Swedish footballer, ski jumper, and Nordic combined skier. Olsson was part of the Djurgården Swedish champions' team of 1912, 1915, and 1917. Olsson made 25 Svenska Serien appearances for Djurgården and scored 6 goals.

Honours 
Djurgårdens IF
 Svenska Mästerskapet (3): 1912, 1915, 1917

References

1886 births
1983 deaths
Swedish footballers
Swedish male ski jumpers
Swedish male Nordic combined skiers
Djurgårdens IF Fotboll players
Svenska Serien players
Association footballers not categorized by position